John W. Haarer (April 21, 1876April 24, 1941) served as the Treasurer of Michigan.

Early life
Haarer was born on April 21, 1876 in Ann Arbor, Michigan.

Career
Haarer worked as a banker and in the insurance business. In 1902, Haarer ran for the Michigan House of Representatives seat representing the Washtenaw County 1st district. Haarer served as Treasurer of Michigan from 1913 to 1916 under Governor Woodbridge N. Ferris.

Personal life
Haarer married Klara A. Bissinger on January 6, 1903. Haarer was affiliated with the Shriners, Elks, and the Freemasons.

Death
Haarer died on April 24, 1941 of a heart attack. Haarer was interred at Deepdale Memorial Park in Delta Township, Michigan.

References

1876 births
1941 deaths
American Freemasons
Politicians from Ann Arbor, Michigan
Burials in Michigan
Michigan Republicans
State treasurers of Michigan
20th-century American politicians